

421001–421100 

|-bgcolor=#f2f2f2
| colspan=4 align=center | 
|}

421101–421200 

|-bgcolor=#f2f2f2
| colspan=4 align=center | 
|}

421201–421300 

|-bgcolor=#f2f2f2
| colspan=4 align=center | 
|}

421301–421400 

|-bgcolor=#f2f2f2
| colspan=4 align=center | 
|}

421401–421500 

|-bgcolor=#f2f2f2
| colspan=4 align=center | 
|}

421501–421600 

|-bgcolor=#f2f2f2
| colspan=4 align=center | 
|}

421601–421700 

|-bgcolor=#f2f2f2
| colspan=4 align=center | 
|}

421701–421800 

|-id=774
| 421774 Jeffreyrose ||  || Jeffrey Robert Rose (1974–2014) was a gifted artist and musician born and raised near Syracuse, New York. He lived and worked in California and Oregon and later returned to New York, touching many people along the way with his kindness and creativity. || 
|}

421801–421900 

|-bgcolor=#f2f2f2
| colspan=4 align=center | 
|}

421901–422000 

|-bgcolor=#f2f2f2
| colspan=4 align=center | 
|}

References 

421001-422000